Kamran Qadakchian (Persian: کامران قدکچیان; born  in Tehran, Iran) is a film director and editor. He is the son of actor Ahmad Qadakchian.

Selected filmography
 Sorcerer, 1972
 The Song of Tehran, 1992
 Wounded, 1997
 Thirst, 2002
 Thirteen Cats on the Hot Gabled Roof, 2004

References

External links
 

Iranian film directors
Living people
1947 births